Rare, Forever is the second album by British electronic musician Leon Vynehall, released on 30 April 2021 by Ninja Tune.

Reception

AllMusic's Paul Simpson wrote, "Even at its most experimental, Vynehall's music radiates with energy and spirit, and Rare, Forever brims with a different type of excitement than his past work." Clash said "Rare, Forever adds to his intoxicating discography, unlimited in scope and undoubtedly Vynehall's most ambitious yet, resulting in one of the year's most fascinating records." Exclaim!'s Dylan Barnabe said Vynehall's "plunge into the more abstract and conceptual is a bold choice, and one that pays off." MusicOMH's Ben Devlin wrote "Vynehall's potential has always been apparent, but Rare, Forever is a truly beguiling record - equal parts poignant and hedonistic - which allows his vast array of talents to shine." NME's Thomas Smith called the album "a slippery, intoxicating listen."

Pitchfork's Shawn Reynaldo wrote "Even without any overarching narrative, Rare, Forever still feels like a triumph. At its core, the LP is a straight-up flex, the work of an artist who has learned to distill his many influences and experiments into a coherent, singular vision, and Vynehall himself is the protagonist of this particular tale", and that "There are few producers in the electronic music realm who can capably translate the 'here's some tracks I made' approach into a compelling album—folks like Floating Points and Four Tet come to mind—and it appears that Vynehall is ready to be welcomed into that cohort." Resident Advisor's Andrew Ryce wrote that "Rare, Forever has all the hallmarks of a big, crossover dance music record, but no one's doing it quite like this."

Year-end lists

Track listing

References

2021 albums
Leon Vynehall albums
Ninja Tune albums
Dance music albums by British artists
Electronic albums by British artists
Experimental music albums by British artists